Etamycin, also known as viridogrisein, is a cyclic peptide antibiotic isolate of marine actinomycete. Etamycin was first isolated from a Streptomyces species in 1957 by Lawson and co-workers.

Notes

Antibiotics
Cyclic peptides